is a river in Hokkaidō, Japan. It is designated a Class A river by the Ministry of Land, Infrastructure, Transport and Tourism.

Course
The river rises on the slopes of Mount Teshio in the Kitami Mountains. After flowing through Takinoue, the river is joined by the Sakurū and Tatsuushi Rivers. At Kamishokotsu in Monbetsu, the river leaves the mountains for the coastal plain. There it is joined by the Utsutsu River before flowing into the Sea of Okhotsk at Shokotsu in Monbetsu.

Lists

List of (named) bridges and dams
From river mouth to source:
  - Route 238 (Japan)
 
  - Hokkaidō Highway 766, Wakunbe-Shokotsu railway
  - Hokkaidō Highway 804, Wakunbe Kamishokotsu line
  - Route 273 (Japan)
  - Hokkaidō Highway 932, Kamishokotsugenya-Kamishokotsu line
  - Route 273 (Japan)
 
 
 
  - Route 273 (Japan)
  - Route 273 (Japan)
  - Route 273 (Japan)

List of (named) tributaries
From river mouth to source:
 Left — 
 Right — 
 Right — 
 Left — 
 Left — 
 Right — 
 Right — 
 Right — 
 Left — 
 Left — 
 Right — 
 Left — 
 Left — 
 Right — 
 Left — 
 Right — 
 Left — 
 Right — 
 Right — 
 Left — 
 Right — 
 Right — 
 Right — 
 Right — 
 Right —   
 Left — 
 Right — 
 Right — 
 Right — 
 Right — 
 Right — 
 Right — 
 Right — 
 Left — 
 Left — 
 Left — 
 Left — 
 Left — 
 Left —

References

Rivers of Hokkaido
Rivers of Japan